The Wright State Raiders men's soccer program represents Wright State University in all NCAA Division I men's college soccer competitions. Founded in 1968, the Raiders compete in the Horizon League. The Raiders are coached by Jake Slemker, who has coached the program for two years. Wright State play their home matches at WSU Alumni Field.

In 2019, for the first time in program history, the Raiders earned a berth into the NCAA Division I Men's Soccer Tournament.

Rivalries 
Wright State's main college soccer rival is Bowling Green. The two compete for the I-75 Cup.

NCAA tournament results

References

External links 
 

 
Soccer clubs in Ohio
1968 establishments in Ohio
Association football clubs established in 1968